Steven Bowey (born 10 July 1974) is an English former professional footballer who played in the Scottish League for Queen of the South and Ayr United. He is currently manager of Chester-le-Street Town.

Career
Born in Ouston Durham, County Durham, Bowey started his career at Forest Green Rovers. He was in the British Army for four years before being signed by Bristol Rovers, before moving on to Gateshead where he played approximately 200 times. After a significant spell at Gateshead, Bowey joined Scottish side Queen of the South. His tenacious midfield play and consistently high form quickly made him into a fans' favourite playing alongside Jim Thomson, Andy Aitken, John O'Neill, Sean O'Connor and Peter Weatherson.

Bowey signed for Conference National team York City from Queen of the South on 25 June 2006, becoming the first player aged 30 or over to join the club in 16 months under Billy McEwan. He scored his first goal for York against Stevenage Borough on 15 August 2006 in a 2–1 victory, which turned out to be the winning goal. He was released by York at the end of the 2006–07 season on 16 May 2007.

Bowey rejoined Gateshead on 17 May 2007 following his release by York. After captaining Gateshead to promotion from the Northern Premier League Premier Division via the play-offs, he failed to agree terms for the following season and was released. He joined Newcastle Blue Star for the 2008–09 season in May 2008. He was appointed as the club's player-manager in August after player-coaches Dean Gordon and Mark Birch left the club. In February 2010, Bowey joined Scottish First Division side Ayr United from Bedlington Terriers to help their relegation battle.

In May 2010 he signed for Conference North side Harrogate Town. Bowey's debut against Corby Town saw him substituted at half time with a leg injury that would keep him out of action for 10 matches. On his return he was handed the captain's armband from Martin Foster. Bowey's first goal for Harrogate Town came on 30 October 2010 against Redditch United.

On 13 May 2011, Bowey was released from Harrogate Town after his contract was not renewed for the new season. He joined Newcastle Benfield, becoming player/manager in October 2012. Although he left to become a coach at Consett in May 2014, he returned to the post of Newcastle Benfield Manager in October the same year. In 2015 he left and became player/assistant manager at Dunston UTS, a post he held until July 2017. In October 2017 he was appointed manager of Ashington. He left the club in January 2019. He was appointed manager of Chester-le-Street Town in October 2022.  
As well as this, he has a notable celebration in which he kneeslides. Which is an iconic celebration in his career which can be found on the York city YouTube Channel.  He also has a son called James.

References

External links

 (Ayr United statistics)

1974 births
Living people
Sportspeople from Durham, England
Footballers from County Durham
English footballers
Association football midfielders
Forest Green Rovers F.C. players
Bristol Rovers F.C. players
Gateshead F.C. players
Queen of the South F.C. players
York City F.C. players
Newcastle Blue Star F.C. players
Bedlington Terriers F.C. players
Ayr United F.C. players
Harrogate Town A.F.C. players
Newcastle Benfield F.C. players
Dunston UTS F.C. players
National League (English football) players
Northern Premier League players
Northern Football League players
Scottish Football League players
English football managers
Newcastle Blue Star F.C. managers
Newcastle Benfield F.C. managers
Ashington A.F.C. managers